Pakan was a provincial electoral district in Alberta, Canada, mandated to return a single member to the Legislative Assembly of Alberta using first-past-the-post balloting from 1909 to 1913.

History
The riding was created in 1909 when Victoria shifted its boundaries west into Sturgeon. The riding was named after the small community of Pakan, Alberta, which is currently known as Fort Victoria, Alberta. Today, the site of the community is a historical museum known as Victoria Settlement.

The riding existed in the central north east part of the province, along the Alberta-Saskatchewan border. It disappeared in 1913 when it was split into Beaver River and St. Paul.

Representation history

The district's only MLA was Prosper-Edmond Lessard, who was acclaimed in 1909 and served until the riding was abolished at the end of the term. He would go on to serve in the new riding of St. Paul.

No election actually ever took place in this district, as there were no other candidates declared in the 1909 election.

Election results

|}

See also
List of Alberta provincial electoral districts
Fort Victoria, Alberta

References

Further reading

External links
Elections Alberta
The Legislative Assembly of Alberta

Former provincial electoral districts of Alberta